Girl, Interrupted is a 1999 American psychological drama film directed by James Mangold and starring Winona Ryder, Angelina Jolie, Clea DuVall, Brittany Murphy, Whoopi Goldberg, Elisabeth Moss, Angela Bettis, Vanessa Redgrave, and Jared Leto. Based on Susanna Kaysen's memoir of the same name, the film follows a young woman who, after a suicide attempt, spends 18 months at a psychiatric hospital between 1967 and 1968.

Girl, Interrupted began as a limited release on December 21, 1999, with a wide expansion on January 14, 2000. The film received mixed reviews from critics, though the performances of Ryder and Jolie received widespread critical acclaim and it has received more positive appreciation in subsequent years. Jolie won the Academy Award for Best Supporting Actress, the Golden Globe Award for Best Supporting Actress – Motion Picture, and the Screen Actors Guild Award for Outstanding Performance by a Female Actor in a Supporting Role.

Plot
In 1967 New England, aimless 18-year-old Susanna Kaysen (Winona Ryder) has a nervous breakdown and overdoses on aspirin and alcohol. Against her wishes, she is checked into Claymoore, a local psychiatric hospital. In the psychiatric ward, Susanna befriends Polly "Torch" Clark (Elisabeth Moss), a childlike girl with schizophrenia, Cynthia Crowley (Jillian Armenante), Daisy Randone (Brittany Murphy), who self-harms and has obsessive–compulsive disorder, and is implied to be bulimic; and Susanna’s roommate; Georgina Tuskin (Clea DuVall), a pathological liar and Janet Webber (Angela Bettis), a sardonic woman with anorexia. Susanna is particularly drawn to the sociopath Lisa Rowe (Angelina Jolie), who is rebellious but charismatic and encourages Susanna to stop taking her medication and resist therapy.

Lisa helps the girls sneak around at night in the hospital's underground tunnels and continuously provokes them and the staff, including the stern head nurse, Valerie Owens (Whoopi Goldberg). Through regular therapy sessions with Dr. Melvin Potts (Jeffrey Tambor), Susanna learns she has borderline personality disorder, a fact Dr. Potts initially conceals from her. On a rare supervised group outing celebrating Daisy's impending release, the women visit an ice cream parlor. There, Susanna is confronted by Barbara Gilcrest (Mary Kay Place), the wife of an English instructor with whom she had an affair, and their daughter, Bonnie (KaDee Strickland). Barbara publicly chastises Susanna for sleeping with her husband; coming to Susanna's defense, Lisa insultingly berates Barbara and the other girls mock her and Bonnie before they both leave, humiliated. This endears Lisa to Susanna even more, though Valerie reprimands Lisa.

In addition to her affair with Dr. Gilchrist, Susanna has a casual relationship with Toby (Jared Leto), a young man who has been drafted to serve in the Vietnam War. He visits Susanna, and begs her to run away with him to Canada. Susanna tells him she has become friends with the other girls and would like to leave someday but not with him. The same night, Polly has a breakdown and is placed in isolation. Susanna and Lisa drug the night watch nurse with a sedative and attempt to comfort Polly by singing to her. Susanna also makes out with John (Travis Fine), one of the hospital orderlies who has a crush on her. When Valerie finds the group sleeping in the hallway in the morning, she punishes the two women, particularly Lisa, who is forced to endure electroshock therapy followed by solitary confinement.

Later that night, Lisa manages to break out of confinement and convinces Susanna to escape with her. The women hitchhike to Daisy's newly-rented apartment, supplied by her doting father, and bribe her with Valium in order to spend the night. Daisy, insistent she has been cured of her illness, is confronted by Lisa when she discovers Daisy has been cutting herself. Lisa taunts and mocks Daisy, accusing her of enjoying the incestuous sexual abuse she has long suffered from her father. The next morning, Susanna finds Daisy dead in her bathroom, having slashed her wrists and hanged herself. Susanna is appalled when Lisa searches Daisy's room and body for cash. Realizing she does not want to become like Lisa, Susanna phones for an ambulance and returns to Claymoore while Lisa flees to Florida.

Upon returning to the hospital, Susanna occupies herself with painting and writing, and cooperates with her therapy, including regular sessions with the hospital's head psychologist, Dr. Sonia Wick (Vanessa Redgrave). Before Susanna is released, Lisa is apprehended and returned to Claymoore. She steals Susanna's diary one night and reads it for the amusement of the patients in the tunnels, turning them against Susanna. After reading an entry in which Susanna feels sympathy for Lisa being a cold, dark person, Lisa attacks Susanna and chases her through the tunnels. Cornered, Susanna confronts Lisa, accusing her of being dead inside, emotionally dependent on Claymoore, and afraid of the world. Lisa breaks down and contemplates suicide, though the others manage to dissuade her. Before Susanna is released the next day, she goes to visit Lisa, who is restrained to a bed. The two reconcile, and Lisa insists she is not actually heartless. They part on good terms and Susanna says her goodbyes to everyone and officially leaves Claymoore.

Cast

 Winona Ryder as Susanna Kaysen, the protagonist. She was 18 years old when diagnosed with borderline personality disorder.
 Angelina Jolie as Lisa Rowe, diagnosed as a sociopath. Charismatic, manipulative, rebellious and abusive, she has been in the institution since she was twelve, and has escaped several times over her eight years there, but is always caught and brought back eventually. She is looked up to by the other patients and forms a close bond with Susanna.
 Clea DuVall as Georgina Tuskin, a pathological liar. She is Susanna's seventeen-year-old roommate and her closest friend next to Lisa in the institution. Susanna confides in her about life and Georgina informs Susanna about the other girls there.
 Brittany Murphy as Daisy Randone, a sexually abused eighteen-year-old girl with OCD who self-harms and is addicted to laxatives. She keeps and hides the carcasses of the cooked chicken that her father brings her in her room.
 Elisabeth Moss as Polly "Torch" Clark, a burn victim who suffers from schizophrenia. She is sixteen years old and is very childlike and easily upset. Georgina informs Susanna that Polly was admitted to Claymoore after her parents told her that she would have to give up her puppy because of her allergies to it, and in response she poured gasoline on the affected area and set it alight, leaving her face horribly scarred. It is later revealed in Polly's file that she was the victim of a house fire.
 Jared Leto as Tobias Jacobs, Susanna's ex-boyfriend who plans to escape to Canada after being drafted into the military.
 Jeffrey Tambor as Dr. Melvin Potts
 Travis Fine as John, an orderly who is smitten with Susanna. He is later sent to work at the men's ward after he and Susanna kiss and fall asleep together.
 Jillian Armenante as Cynthia Crowley. She claims that she is a sociopath like Lisa, but Lisa denies the claim and states that she is a "dyke". She is twenty-two and is easily amused.
 Angela Bettis as Janet Webber, an anorexic. Like Lisa, she is abrasive and seemingly aloof, but is also easily irritated or upset. She is twenty years old.
 Vanessa Redgrave as Dr. Sonia Wick, the head psychologist of the hospital.
 Whoopi Goldberg as Valerie Owens, the stern but caring head nurse who oversees the hospital.

In addition, Ray Baker portrays Carl Kaysen, Susanna's father, while Joanna Kerns portrays Annette, Susanna's mother.

Production

Development
In June 1993, Columbia Pictures fought off a number of other studios to buy the film rights to Kaysen's memoir. Winona Ryder, who had also attempted to buy the film rights, ultimately partnered with producer Douglas Wick to develop the project as a star vehicle. The film was then stuck in development hell for five years, with three different scripts written but none satisfying Ryder and Wick, their reasoning being that Kaysen's book struggled to translate to film. Ryder approached James Mangold to direct, after seeing his film debut Heavy. Ryder, Wick and Mangold settled on a final shooting script in mid-1998, with Columbia pushing back production on the film until early 1999 in order for Ryder to shoot their horror film Lost Souls.

Casting
Because of the volume of strong female characters in the film, a number of young actresses sought parts in it. Reese Witherspoon, Christina Ricci, Katie Holmes, Gretchen Mol, Kate Hudson, Alicia Witt, Sarah Polley, and Rose McGowan all auditioned for unspecified roles. "It's the only decent thing out there that doesn't involve taking your clothes off," McGowan said in 1998. Mangold also met with Courtney Love to discuss the role of Lisa as well as Alanis Morissette for a role. Parker Posey turned down a role, while Leelee Sobieski signed on to play Daisy but dropped out weeks before filming began after receiving an offer to star in Joan of Arc.

Filming

Filming took place primarily in Mechanicsburg, Pennsylvania, as well as in Harrisburg State Hospital in Harrisburg, Pennsylvania, in early 1999. Mechanicsburg was chosen for its old-fashioned appearance and its old-style drugstore simply titled "Drugs", all of which gave the film its time-dated appearance. A scene in the trailer shows a van traveling towards downtown Harrisburg over the State Street Bridge, where the Capitol building is clearly visible. Scenes later deleted were also filmed at Reading's Public Museum.

Reception

Critical response

Girl, Interrupted received mixed reviews from critics. As of 2022, the film holds a rating of 53% on the review aggregator website Rotten Tomatoes, based on 115 reviews, with an average rating of 5.70/10. The site's consensus states: "Angelina Jolie gives an intense performance, but overall Girl, Interrupted suffers from thin, predictable plotting that fails to capture the power of its source material." The film also has a rating of 51 on Metacritic, based 32 reviews, indicating "mixed or average reviews". Audiences polled by CinemaScore gave the film an average grade of "B" on an A+ to F scale.

Writing for The New York Times, Stephen Holden wrote: "Girl, Interrupted is a small, intense period piece with a hardheaded tough-love attitude toward lazy, self-indulgent little girls flirting with madness: You can drive yourself crazy, or you can get over it. The choice is yours." Tom Coates from the BBC wrote: "Girl, Interrupted is a decent adaptation of [Kaysen's] memoir of this period, neatened up and polished for an audience more familiar with gloss than grit." Kenneth Turan of the Los Angeles Times was critical of the screenplay adaptation from the source novel, writing that it has "a hard time resisting manufacturing obvious, standard-issue drama of the One Flew Over the Cuckoo's Nest knockoff variety," though he conceded that the performances of Ryder and Jolie help the film "stay as honest as it manages to sporadically be... Both women have connected strongly to their parts, and they ensure their characters' reality even if the dramas they are involved with don't always rise to that standard."

Paul Tatara of CNN panned the film's screenplay for containing little "self-reflection in the dialogue," adding that "Each girl is simply issued a quirk that she drags around like a ball and chain." Tatara summarized: "The good news is that writer-director James Mangold's Girl, Interrupted is one of the best films of the year. The bad news is that you have to be a hyper-sensitive 17-year-old girl to think so." Roger Ebert was critical of the film's failure to focus on the themes it presents, writing: "The film is mostly about character and behavior and although there are individual scenes of powerful acting, there doesn't seem to be a destination. That's why the conclusion is so unsatisfying: The story, having failed to provide itself with character conflicts that can be resolved with drama, turns to melodrama instead."

Charlotte O'Sullivan of the Time Out Film Guide praised Jolie's performance, but was critical of Ryder's, writing: "Does it matter that every time Jolie's offscreen the film wilts a little? Ryder should be perfect as the bright spark; her lines are sharp as a knife. There's a gap, however, between what we hear and what we see. Ryder's too wide-eyed and cutesy, and when we see her with nurse Valerie (Goldberg), we know it's only a matter of time before they start hugging." The San Francisco Chronicles Peter Stack was unimpressed by the film, deeming it "a muddled production that misses the jarring tone of the autobiographical book by Susanna Kaysen on which it is based. The film is entertaining, but not very powerful." Jami Bernard of the New York Daily News gave the film a mixed review, awarding it two out of four stars, writing that "[Ryder] is often just a crumpled, listless figure on a bed, which, while true to the nature of depression, is not, cinematically speaking, the most arresting image," and likening the performances of Whoopi Goldberg and Vanessa Redgrave as "bordering on cameos".

Author opinion
The author, Susanna Kaysen, was among the detractors of the film, accusing Mangold of adding "melodramatic drivel" to the story by inventing plot points that were not in the book (such as Lisa and Susanna running away together).

Themes

Confusion of social nonconformity with insanity
Susanna wonders if her prolonged stay at Claymoore is justified. The doctor is hasty in his analysis of her and bases his diagnosis on preconceived ideas relating to gender bias. Her diagnosis suggests that "normal" is as relative as insanity is, and Kaysen interrogates the Diagnostic and Statistical Manual of Mental Disorders definition of borderline personality disorder, calling it a "generalization" rather than a specific case study. She points out that while she is considered recovered from that condition, she still has the first symptom, which is "uncertainty about several life issues". While Susanna is speaking to her doctor Melvin, she calls the rest of the patients "fucking crazy" and that she does not belong with them; however, her parents and the doctor think otherwise, and soon she also realizes that she's not much different than them.

Forced institutionalization
Lisa calls therapy "the-rapey", which is a play on words insinuating that the therapy they are forced to undergo in the institution feels like rape (psychological) and says the more a person divulges their secrets, the more likely they would be considered for release. However, on the flip side for people like Susanna and Lisa, who claim to have no secrets, the option of release seems oblique. "Although the construct of the asylum represented an immeasurable tool in the pursuit to expiate mental illness, the respect for patient autonomy appeared to have been relegated to those without mental illness". In 1973, the infamous phrase "dying with one's rights on" was coined by Darold Treffert, referring to the ultimate prioritization of patient autonomy over beneficence.

Representations of being a woman with mental illness
The emergence of women's liberation movements in the 1960s is of significance to the period Kaysen's memoir is set. The rights as well as standards were set much differently for women than they were men. Doctor Melvin originally doesn't inform Susanna of her diagnosis, deeming it was unnecessary for her to know. Eventually, when he informs her of the diagnosis, he cites the disorder being more common in women than in men. Subsequent studies on the understandings of the linkages between gender and mental health since the 1960s and 1970s have identified a more even gender balance in overall levels of mental health as they have incorporated a wider range of disorders.

Isolation
The physical depiction of Claymoore is reminiscent of a prison. With bar-covered windows and regular room inspections to make sure the girls are not causing harm to themselves as well as not trying to escape, the girls are subject to the mercy of the ever watchful staff. The theme of isolation is exhibited in Susanna's life as neither her parents nor her boyfriend (who quits after a few attempts) come to visit her in the institution. The theme of isolation also serves as a protective shield from the dangers of the outside world as even Lisa complains that "there's nobody to take care of you out there", and people like Torrey are safe from an abusive home and drug-pushing environment.

Accolades

Soundtrack
The film's official soundtrack was released on January 18, 2000.

References

Sources
 
 Chouinard, V. (2009). Placing the 'mad woman': troubling cultural representations of being a woman with mental illness in Girl Interrupted, Social & Cultural Geography Vol 10, No 7: 791-804.
 Parr, H. (2000) Interpreting the 'hidden social geographies' of mental health: ethnographies of inclusion and exclusion in semi-institutional places, Health & Place 6: 225–237.
 Shildrick, M. (2002) Embodying the monster: Encounters with the vulnerable self. London: Sage.
 Wahl, O., Wood, A., Zaveri, P., Drapalski, A. and Mann, B. (2003) Mental illness depiction in children's films, Journal of Community Psychology 31: 553–560.

External links

 
 
 
 

1999 films
1999 drama films
1990s biographical drama films
1990s coming-of-age drama films
1990s psychological drama films
3 Arts Entertainment films
American biographical drama films
American coming-of-age drama films
American psychological drama films
Borderline personality disorder in fiction
Columbia Pictures films
Coming-of-age films based on actual events
Drama films based on actual events
1990s English-language films
Films about bullying
Films about drugs
Films about psychiatry
Films based on memoirs
Films directed by James Mangold
Films produced by Cathy Konrad
Films produced by Douglas Wick
Films featuring a Best Supporting Actress Academy Award-winning performance
Films featuring a Best Supporting Actress Golden Globe-winning performance
Films scored by Mychael Danna
Films set in 1967
Films set in 1968
Films set in Pennsylvania
Films set in psychiatric hospitals
Films shot in Harrisburg, Pennsylvania
Films with screenplays by James Mangold
Incest in film
Mental health in the United States
Films about self-harm
1990s American films
Films about disability